Melville Crombie (28 May 1876 – 23 April 1932) was a New Zealand cricketer. He played in three first-class matches for Wellington from 1900 to 1912.

See also
 List of Wellington representative cricketers

References

External links
 

1876 births
1932 deaths
New Zealand cricketers
Wellington cricketers
Cricketers from Wellington City